Haiyan Wang is an American engineer. As the Basil S. Turner Professor of Engineering at Purdue University's School of Materials Engineering and the School of Electrical and Computer Engineering, she is a Fellow of the National Academy of Inventors, American Association for the Advancement of Science, American Ceramic Society, and American Physical Society.

Wang's research focuses on high-temperature superconductors, coated conductors, nanostructured functional ceramics for solid oxide fuel cells, plasmonics and photonics, ferroelectric and multiferroics, radiation tolerance materials, and bulk structural metals and ceramics.

Early life and education
Wang was born and raised in China, where she remained for her Bachelor of Science degree and Master's degree at Nanchang University and Institute of Metal Research. Following this, she enrolled at North Carolina State University in the United States for her PhD. She defended her thesis in 2002 under the supervision of Jagdish Nararyan. Upon completing her doctorate degree, Wang joined the staff at Los Alamos National Laboratory, first as a postdoctoral fellow and later as a technical staff member.

Career

Texas A&M
Upon completing her fellowship, Wang joined the faculty at Texas A&M University as an assistant professor in 2006. During her early years at the institution, she earned an Air Force Young Investigators Research Grant to study nanoengineered YBCO coated conductors for flux pinning enhancements. In 2008, Wang received an Presidential Early Career Award for Scientists and Engineers and another grant for her project Nanoscale Microstructural Characterizations of Multifunctional Ceramic Nanocomposites. By 2011, Wang earned the ASM International Silver Medal Award for her "innovative research at the frontier of nanostructured materials and application, and for exceptional potential in inspired education and future leadership."

Throughout her later tenure at Texas A&M, Wang also worked part-time at the National Science Foundation as a program manager in the Division of Materials Research. In 2014, she was named Fellow of ASM International and one of four recipients of the Edith and Peter O’Donnell Award. The following year, she was named a Fellow of American Association for the Advancement of Science 
the American Ceramic Society, and received an AFS Distinguished Achievement Award.

Purdue
Wang left Texas A&M in August 2016 to become the Basil S. Turner Professor of Engineering at Purdue University's School of Materials Engineering and the School of Electrical and Computer Engineering. Upon joining the staff, she was elected a Fellow of the American Physical Society for her "exceptional contributions to the field of physics." A few years later, her "innovative research on multifunctional ceramic nanocomposites, superconductors, solid oxide fuel cells and in situ TEM," earned her an election to the non-profit organization Materials Research Society.

During the COVID-19 pandemic, Wang and her colleagues developed a hybrid plasmonic thin-film, two-phase vertically aligned nanocomposite with controllable metal pillar density with tunable diameters. The aim of the design was to improve the performance of handheld optical sensors used for food safety detection and water quality analysis. Following this, she was elected a Fellow of the National Academy of Inventors for "pioneering the designs of vertically aligned nanocomposites in oxide-oxide, oxide metal, nitride metal and many other systems." Later, she co-published Nanocomposite-Seeded Epitaxial Growth of Single-Domain Lithium Niobate Thin Films for Surface Acoustic Wave Devices, which described a new method for developing epitaxial lithium niobate thin films. Her research team developed a versatile nanocomposite-seeded approach that allowed scientists to create single-layer films.

References

External links

Living people
American women engineers
American academics of Chinese descent
Nanchang University alumni
North Carolina State University alumni
Texas A&M University faculty
Purdue University faculty
Fellows of the National Academy of Inventors
Fellows of the American Association for the Advancement of Science
Fellows of the American Physical Society
Fellows of the American Ceramic Society
Year of birth missing (living people)
21st-century American women